Dubai International City is a country-themed collection of residences, businesses, and tourist attractions. Spreading over an area of 800 hectares (8 million square meters), the arrangement of the city is inspired by the traditional carpets of the Middle East. Once completed, the project will contain studio and one-bedroom apartments, and accommodate over 60,000 residents. Dubai International City is located in the Al Warsan region of Dubai, close to the Dubai Central Fruit and Vegetable Market.

Description
The International City residential district is planned to have numerous country-specific and themed residential developments and retail outlets. The plans include ten country-specific districts (or "clusters"): China; England mirroring traditional London architecture; France district featuring residential blocks characterized by long French windows, red and grey bricks, and pilasters or half-columns; Persia district situated in the heart of the residential district; Greece district; Russia district, the northernmost residential district; Spain district featuring three- and four-storey buildings designed according to traditional stucco exterior finish; Morocco district; Italy district; Emirates district. The Central District includes building security, pools, private parking, gyms, parks, and shopping areas. Other areas include the Lake District.

Inspired by the Forbidden City of Beijing, China, a shopping mall covering an area of 240,000 square metres with parking facilities for 2,000 cars has been constructed to the north of the China Cluster. Chinamex's DragonMart, developed by Nakheel Properties, is a large mall for wholesale purchase of Chinese products. The mall has been a commercial success and a second mall has been constructed ("Dragon Mart 2"), adjacent to the original Dragon Mart 1, that has 175,000 square metres of space and 4,500 parking spaces. The project was completed in December 2015.

Launched in 2013, Warsan Village is located at the periphery of International City. This enclave within International City features 942 townhouses and 250 apartments. Construction was finished in Q3 2019.

There are a number of hospitals and medical clinics in the vicinity. For driving license-related (Road & Transport Authority Dubai) eye testing and medical tests for commercial taxi drivers or new drivers can be completed from Apple International Polyclinic. Recent regulations implemented by the Municipality of Dubai will greatly address the prevalence of Shisha [Arabic Tobacco] parlors housed in many buildings.

History
While Nakheel's intentions were to make low and medium-cost housing available to the masses (who were suffering due to the real-estate boom until mid-2008 and before the GFC) by providing medium and low-income earners with legal and decent housing instead of resorting to illegitimate villa sharing, Dubai was badly hit by the Global Financial Crisis. This led to a devaluation of rentals by 75–80% of their value in 2008. Due to this sudden drop in prices, even the extremely lowest income group (laborers, truck drivers, taxi drivers) identified this area as a potential upgrade to their existing labor camps. Coupled with Nakheel's financial downfall, controls and checks over the city's security, compliance to regulations and maintenance of infrastructure were dropped beginning in January 2009 by the developer who used to control and maintain this earlier.

In 2008, Nakheel's International City Development was questioned by news articles with controversies and issues. These articles claim International City has struggled with a poor reputation and negative press reports stemming from various issues including problems with its own sewage systems and the nearby sewage facility, access to the site, and a perceived lack of amenities. A follow-up poll from Emirates 24-7 revealed that a huge percentage – 91 percent – of readers showed “a marked aversion to investing in International City units.” A considerable 67 percent said they "would not touch the place". This issue has been solved by 2012.

Due to its proximity to the sewage treatment plant, and constant overflow, certain clusters like Morocco, Emirates and China are subjected to the odor of sewage when the wind direction changes at night. Traffic gridlocks have existed.

Travel
The community is serviced by the RTA bus service.

Bus routes
 X23 Dubai Gold Souk Bus: Dubai International City --> Ras Al Khor --> Oud Metha --> Dubai Gold Souk. Operates in a 10 to 15 minute frequency.
 365 Rashidiya Metro Station Bus: Dubai International City --> Silicon Oasis --> Dubai Academic City --> Rashidiya Metro Station. Operates in a 25 to 30-minute frequency.
 53 Dubai Gold Souk Bus: Dubai International City --> Al Badia --> Dubai Festival City --> Deira City Centre --> Dubai Gold Souk. Operates in a 25 to 30-minute frequency.
 366 Silicon Oasis Bus: Rashidiya Metro Station --> Dubai International City --> Silicon Oasis. Operates in a 20 to 30 minutes frequency.

See also
 Developments in Dubai
 List of communities in Dubai

References

External links

 Dragon Tower Dubai

Residential communities in Dubai
Mixed-use developments in the United Arab Emirates
Nakheel Properties